The Monocoupe 90 was a two-seat, light cabin airplane built by Donald A. Luscombe for Monocoupe Aircraft. The first Monocoupe (Model 5) was built in an abandoned church in Davenport, Iowa, and first flew on April 1, 1927. Various models were in production until the late 1940s.

Development
The Monocoupes were side-by-side two-seat lightplanes of mixed wood and steel-tube basic construction with fabric covering. A braced high-wing monoplane with fixed tailskid landing gear, and the reverse curve rear fuselage lines that were to become one of the signature identifier features of the Monocoupes. The fuselage framework was built up of welded steel tubing in a rigid, triangular-framed Warren truss form for the side panel structures, heavily faired to shape with dural metal sheet formers and wooden fairing strips. The wings were built up of solid spruce spars with wing ribs of basswood webs and spruce cap-strips. The leading edges were covered with dural metal sheet and the entire framework was covered in fabric.

The aircraft was powered originally by either a 60 hp (45 kW) Anzani engine or the unsuccessful 65 hp (48 kW) Detroit Air-Cat radial. The Model 22 was the first light aircraft awarded a type certificate (number 22) and in 1930 it was fitted with the Velie M-5 62 hp (46 kW) five-cylinder radial engine to become the Model 70.

In 1930 Monocoupe introduced the Model 90 with refined lines and a fuselage that was slightly longer and wider, this being sold in Model 90 and Model 90A versions with a 90 hp (67 kW) Lambert R-266 radial engine. The Monocoupe 90 DeLuxe introduced trailing edge flaps, wheel speed fairings and an improved engine cowling. The Model 90AF was fitted with a 115 hp (86 kW) Franklin engine. The Model 90AL had Avco Lycoming engines. The Model 90J was introduced in 1930 with a 90 hp (67 kW) Warner Scarab Jr engine.

The final two high performance Monocoupe models developed from the Model 90 were the Model 110 with a 110 hp (82 kW) Warner Scarab, and the Model 125 with a 125 hp (93 kW) Kinner B-5 engine. The Monocoupe 110 Special was a clipped wing racing aircraft. The Monocoupe Model 70V of 1932, had the low-powered 65 hp (48-kW) Velie M-5 engine reintroduced to provide more economical operation at the cost of a fall in performance.

In 1941 Monocoupe combined with three other companies to form Universal Molded Products Corp. 20 Model 90AFs were bought by the USAAF, who designated them the Universal L-7, for transfer to the Free French Forces. One was lost during delivery. 

Aircraft production halted during World War II, resuming briefly in 1948-1950 under the name Monocoupe Airplane and Engine Corporation. 

The last of this remarkable line of two-seat aircraft was the Monocoupe D-145 of 1934, a high-performance version with a slightly enlarged cabin and powered by a 145 hp (108 kW) Warner Super Scarab engine.

Variants
Monocoupe Model 5 prototype
Monocoupe Model 22 60 hp (45 kW) Anzani engine or 65 hp (48 kW) Detroit Air Cat radial.
Monocoupe Model 70 Velie M-5 62 hp (46 kW) five-cylinder radial engine

Monocoupe Model 113 revised landing gear and a number of improvements
Monocoupe Monoprep dedicated trainer similar to the Monocoupe 113
Monocoupe Monosport Model 1 air racing model, had a 110 hp (82 kW) Warner Scarab seven-cylinder radial engine
Monocoupe Monosport Model 2 air racing model, had a 100 hp (75 kW) Kinner K-5 radial engine

Monocoupe Model 90 longer wider fuselage
Monocoupe Model 90A 90 hp (67 kW) Lambert R-266 radial engine
Monocoupe 90 DeLuxe trailing edge flaps, wheel speed fairings and an improved engine cowling
Monocoupe Model 90AF 115 hp (86 kW) Franklin engine
Monocoupe Model 90AL Avco Lycoming engine

Monocoupe Model 90AW with 145 hp Warner engine, Wing Span 32 ft. Length 20 ft. 5.75 in.
Monocoupe Model 110 110 hp (82 kW) Warner Scarab engine
Monocoupe Model 110 Special racing model, 110 hp (82 kW) Warner Scarab engine, shorter span
Monocoupe Model 125 125 hp (93 kW) Kinner B-5 engine
Universal L-7 military version of the Model 90AF.
Monocoupe D-145 145 hp (108 kW) Warner Super Scarab engine.

Operators
The majority of the Monocoupe 90s to be built were sold to and flown by private pilot owners.

Spanish Republican Air Force - Monocoupe 90 A

Free French Forces, later Armée de l'Air - Monocoupe 90 AF
19 delivered early 1943 by sea to Abu Sweir, Egypt, to be reassembled by RAF MU 109. Main delivery to create a flying school (GE 11) in Rayack, Syria, opening September 1, 1943. The Monocoupe 90 was too sensitive to be used for basic training and many accidents occurred until school disbandment January 4, 1944. One aircraft survived the war and remained on the French civil register until written-off in 1962. 
5 aircraft delivered to Madagascar in early September 1943 and operated by Escadrille d'Avions Sanitaires et de Liaison (EASL = Liaison and Medical Flight) based at Ivato. EASL became Escadrille de Liaison et de Commandement (ELC) on January 1, 1944, then SAL-51 and last SLA-50. The last two Monocoupes were sold to local aéro-club in 1948.

Specifications (Model 90A)

See also

References
Notes

Bibliography
 Bell, Dana ed. The Smithsonian National Air and Space Museum Directory of Airplanes their Designers and Manufacturers. Stackpole Books Mechanicsburg, PA, 2002. .
 Eden, Paul and Moeng, Soph,  eds. The Complete Encyclopedia of World Aircraft. London: Amber Books Ltd., 2002. .
 Fahey, James C. U.S. Army Aircraft 1908-1946. Ships and Aircraft, Falls Church, VA. 1946.
 Simpson, Rod. Airlife's World Aircraft, Airlife Publishing, 2001. 
 "Specifications of American Airplanes". Aviation, March 1936, Vol. 35, no. 3. pp. 82–85. Registration required
 Swanborough, F. G. and Bowers, Peter M.United States Military Aircraft Since 1909. Putnam New York, 1964. .

External links

 Old Rhinebeck Aerodrome's Monocoupe 90
 Aerofiles
 National Air and Space Museum, Smithsonian Institution
 Monocoupe article at Fiddlersgreen.net

1930s United States civil utility aircraft
Single-engined tractor aircraft
High-wing aircraft
Aircraft first flown in 1927
Luscombe aircraft
Monocoupe utility aircraft